Nikolay Mikhaylovich Lyukshinov (27 October 1915 – 18 March 2010) was a Soviet Russian football player and coach.

External links
 

1915 births
People from Ivanovo Oblast
2010 deaths
Soviet footballers
Soviet football managers
FC Zenit Saint Petersburg managers
Soviet expatriate football managers
Expatriate football managers in Albania
Albania national football team managers
FK Partizani Tirana managers
FC Dynamo Saint Petersburg managers
Association football forwards
Burials at Serafimovskoe Cemetery
Russian footballers
Russian football managers
Russian expatriate football managers
Sportspeople from Ivanovo Oblast